Ozovehe is a native name of Ebira people. It means "child is life". The name is usually given to first male born of a family - this is not exclusively for first male borns i.e. any male born could bear the name. It is an expression of the joy of having a male child - who are often seen as those to carry on the family name.

A married woman that delayed before she conceive pregnancy could also name the child Ozovehe, especially if the child is a male child.

Ozovehe is a popular name that you will find in virtually every home in Ebiraland.

The seemingly close feminine equivalent is Ozohu or Oziohu meaning "Child is the greatest" i.e. greatest of all natural gifts.

Society of Nigeria